Viktor Ihorovych Lonskyy (born 27 October 1995) is a Ukrainian athlete specialising in the high jump.

Career 
Lonskyy won a bronze at the 2017 European U23 Championships.

His personal bests in the event are 2.28 metres outdoors (Kropyvnytskiy 2017) and 2.28 metres indoors (Minsk 2017).

International competitions

References

1995 births
Living people
Ukrainian male high jumpers
People from Berdychiv
Competitors at the 2019 Summer Universiade
Sportspeople from Zhytomyr Oblast